Kalmunai Divisional Secretariat may refer to:

 Kalmunai Divisional Muslim Secretariat
 Kalmunai Divisional Tamil Secretariat